Cosmotoma adjuncta is a species of longhorn beetles of the subfamily Lamiinae. It was described by Thomson in 1860, and is widely distributed throughout South America, as well as Central American countries such as Panama, Costa Rica, and Bolivia.

References

Beetles described in 1860
Cosmotoma